French Canadians (referred to as Canadiens mainly before the twentieth century; , ; feminine form:), or Franco-Canadians, refers to an ethnic group who trace their ancestry to French colonists who settled in Canada beginning in the 17th century. 

During the 17th century, French settlers originating mainly from the west and north of France settled Canada. It is from them that the French Canadian ethnicity was born. During the 17th to 18th centuries, French Canadians expanded across North America and colonized various regions, cities, and towns. As a result people of French Canadian descent can be found across North America. Between 1840 and 1930, many French Canadians immigrated to New England, an event known as the Grande Hémorragie.

Etymology 
French Canadians get their name from Canada, the most developed and densely populated region of New France during the period of French colonization in the 17th and 18th centuries. The original use of the term Canada referred to the land area along the St. Lawrence River, divided in three districts (Québec, Trois-Rivières, and Montréal), as well as to the Pays d'en Haut (Upper Countries), a vast and thinly settled territorial dependence north and west of Montreal which covered the whole of the Great Lakes area.

From 1535 to the 1690s, the French word Canadien had referred to the First Nations the French had encountered in the St. Lawrence River valley at Stadacona and Hochelaga. At the end of the 17th century, Canadien became an ethnonym distinguishing the inhabitants of Canada from those of France. After World War II, English-speakers living in Canada appropriated the term "Canadian" for themselves. To distinguish between the newer English-speaking population and the "old Canadians", the terms English-Canadian and French-Canadian emerged. During the Quiet Revolution of the 1960s to 1980s, inhabitants of Quebec began to identify as Québécois instead of simply French-Canadian.

Genetics 
French Canadians of Quebec are a classic example of founder population. Over 150 years of French colonization, between 1608 and 1760, an estimated 8,500 pioneers married and left at least one descendant on the territory. Following the takeover of the colony by the British crown in 1760, immigration from France effectively stopped, but descendants of French settlers continued to grow in number due to their high fertility rate. Intermarriage occurred mostly with the deported Acadians and migrants coming from the British Isles. Since the 20th century, the French-Canadian population has experienced significantly more intermixing with other ethnic groups, from many different origins. Nevertheless, while the French Canadians of Quebec today may be partly of other ancestries, the genetic contribution of the original French founders remains predominant, explaining about 90% of regional gene pools, while Acadians (descended from other French settlers in eastern Canada) account for 4% and British 2%, with Native American and other groups contributing less.

History 

French settlers from Normandy, Perche, Beauce, Brittany, Maine, Anjou, Touraine, Poitou, Aunis, Angoumois, Saintonge, and Gascony were the first Europeans to permanently colonize what is now Quebec, parts of Ontario, Acadia, and select areas of Western Canada, all in Canada (see French colonization of the Americas). Their colonies of New France (also commonly called Canada) stretched across what today are the Maritime provinces, southern Quebec and Ontario, as well as the entire Mississippi River Valley.

The first permanent European settlements in Canada were at Port Royal in 1605 and Quebec City in 1608 as fur trading posts. The territories of New France were Canada, Acadia (later renamed Nova Scotia), and Louisiana. The inhabitants of the French colony of Canada (modern-day Quebec) called themselves the Canadiens, and came mostly from northwestern France. The early inhabitants of Acadia, or Acadians (Acadiens), came mostly but not exclusively from the southwestern regions of France.

Canadien explorers and fur traders would come to be known as coureurs des bois and voyageurs, while those who settled on farms in Canada would come to be known as habitants. Many French Canadians are the descendants of the King's Daughters (Filles du Roi) of this era. A few  also are the descendants of mixed French and Algonquian marriages (see also Metis people and Acadian people). During the mid-18th century, French explorers and Canadiens born in French Canada colonized other parts of North America in what are today the states of Louisiana (called Louisianais), Mississippi, Missouri, Illinois, Vincennes, Indiana, Louisville, Kentucky, the Windsor-Detroit region and the Canadian prairies (primarily Southern Manitoba).

After the 1760 British conquest of New France in the French and Indian War (known as the Seven Years' War in Canada), the French-Canadian population remained important in the life of the colonies. The British gained Acadia by the Treaty of Utrecht in 1713. It took the 1774 Quebec Act for French Canadians to regain the French civil law system, and in 1791 French Canadians in Lower Canada were introduced to the British parliamentary system when an elected Legislative Assembly was created. The Legislative Assembly having no real power, the political situation degenerated into the Lower Canada Rebellions of 1837–1838, after which Lower Canada and Upper Canada were unified. Some of the motivations for the union was to limit French-Canadian political power and at the same time transferring a large part of the Upper Canadian debt to the debt-free Lower Canada. After many decades of British immigration, the Canadiens became a minority in the Province of Canada in the 1850s.

French-Canadian contributions were essential in securing responsible government for the Canadas and in undertaking Canadian Confederation. In the late 19th and 20th centuries, French Canadians' discontent grew with their place in Canada because of a series of events: including the execution of Louis Riel, the elimination of official bilingualism in Manitoba, Canada's military participation in the Second Boer War, Regulation 17 which banned French-language schools in Ontario, the Conscription Crisis of 1917 and the Conscription Crisis of 1944.

Between the 1840s and the 1930s, some 900,000 French Canadians immigrated to the New England region. About half of them returned home. The generations born in the United States would eventually come to see themselves as Franco-Americans. During the same period of time, numerous French Canadians also migrated and settled in Eastern and Northern Ontario. The descendants of those Quebec inter-provincial migrants constitute the bulk of today's Franco-Ontarian community.

Since 1968, French has been one of Canada's two official languages. It is the sole official language of Quebec and one of the official languages of New Brunswick, Yukon, the Northwest Territories, and Nunavut. The province of Ontario has no official languages defined in law, although the provincial government provides French language services in many parts of the province under the French Language Services Act.

Language

There are many varieties of French spoken by francophone Canadians, for example Quebec French, Acadian French, Métis French, and Newfoundland French. The French spoken in Ontario, the Canadian West, and New England can trace their roots back to Quebec French because of Quebec's diaspora. Over time, many regional accents have emerged. Canada is estimated to be home to between 32 and 36 regional French accents, 17 of which can be found in Quebec, and 7 of which are found in New Brunswick. There are also people who will naturally speak using Québécois Standard or Joual which are considered sociolects.

There are about seven million French Canadians and native French speakers in Quebec. Another one million French-speaking French Canadians are distributed throughout the rest of Canada. French Canadians may also speak Canadian English or American English, especially if they live in overwhelmingly English-speaking environments. In Canada, not all those of French Canadian ancestry speak French, but the vast majority do. In the United States, assimilation to the English language was more significant and very few Americans of French-Canadian ancestry or heritage speak French today. Those that do are called Franco-Americans. 

Francophones living in Canadian provinces other than Quebec have enjoyed minority language rights under Canadian law since the Official Languages Act of 1969, and under the Canadian Constitution since 1982, protecting them from provincial governments that have historically been indifferent towards their presence. At the provincial level, New Brunswick formally designates French as a full official language, while other provinces vary in the level of French language services they offer. All three of Canada's territories include French as an official language of the territory alongside English and local indigenous languages, although in practice French-language services are normally available only in the capital cities and not across the entire territory.

Religion 
Christianity is the predominant religion of French Canadians, with Roman Catholicism the chief denomination. The kingdom of France forbade non-Catholic settlement in New France from 1629 onward and thus, almost all French settlers of Canada were Catholic. In the United States, some families of French-Canadian origin have converted to Protestantism. Until the 1960s, religion was a central component of French-Canadian national identity. The Church parish was the focal point of civic life in French-Canadian society, and religious orders ran French-Canadian schools, hospitals and orphanages and were very influential in everyday life in general. During the Quiet Revolution of the 1960s, however, the practice of Catholicism dropped drastically. Church attendance in Quebec currently remains low. Rates of religious observance among French Canadians outside Quebec tend to vary by region, and by age. In general, however, those in Quebec are the least observant, while those in the United States of America and other places away from Quebec tend to be the most observant.

Geographical distribution 

People who claim some French-Canadian ancestry or heritage number some 7 million in Canada. In the United States, 2.4 million people report French-Canadian ancestry or heritage, while an additional 8.4 million claim French ancestry; they are treated as a separate ethnic group by the U.S. Census Bureau.

Canada 

In Canada, 85% of French Canadians reside in Quebec where they constitute the majority of the population in all regions except the far North (Nord-du-Québec). Most cities and villages in this province were built and settled by the French or French Canadians during the French colonial rule.

There are various urban and small centres in Canada outside Quebec that have long-standing populations of French Canadians, going back to the late 19th century, due to interprovincial migration. Eastern and Northern Ontario have large populations of francophones in communities such as Ottawa, Cornwall, Hawkesbury, Sudbury, Timmins, North Bay, Timiskaming, Welland and Windsor. Many also pioneered the Canadian Prairies in the late 18th century, founding the towns of Saint Boniface, Manitoba and in Alberta's Peace Country, including the region of Grande Prairie.

It is estimated that roughly 70–75% of Quebec's population descend from the French pioneers of the 17th and 18th century.

The French-speaking population have massively chosen the "Canadian" ("Canadien) ethnic group since the government made it possible (1986), which has made the current statistics misleading. The term Canadien historically referred only to a French-speaker, though today it is used in French to describe any Canadian citizen.

United States 

In the United States, many cities were founded as colonial outposts of New France by French or French-Canadian explorers. They include Mobile (Alabama), Coeur d'Alene (Idaho), Vincennes (Indiana), Belleville (Illinois), Bourbonnais (Illinois), Prairie du Rocher (Illinois), Dubuque (Iowa), Baton Rouge (Louisiana), New Orleans (Louisiana), Detroit (Michigan), Biloxi (Mississippi), Creve Coeur (Missouri), St. Louis (Missouri), Pittsburgh (Fort Duquesne, Pennsylvania), Provo (Utah), Green Bay (Wisconsin), La Crosse (Wisconsin), Milwaukee (Wisconsin) or Prairie du Chien (Wisconsin).

The majority of the French-Canadian population in the United States is found in the New England area, although there is also a large French-Canadian presence in Plattsburgh, New York, across Lake Champlain from Burlington, Vermont. Quebec and Acadian emigrants settled in industrial cities like Fitchburg, Leominster, Lynn, Worcester, Haverhill, Waltham, Lowell, Gardner, Lawrence, Chicopee, Somerset, Fall River, and New Bedford in Massachusetts; Woonsocket in Rhode Island; Manchester and Nashua in New Hampshire; Bristol, Hartford,  and East Hartford in Connecticut; throughout the state of Vermont, particularly in Burlington, St. Albans, and Barre; and Biddeford and Lewiston in Maine. Smaller groups of French Canadians settled in the Midwest, notably in the states of Michigan, Illinois, Wisconsin, Nebraska, Iowa, Missouri, and Minnesota. French-Canadians also settled in central North Dakota, largely in Rolette and Bottineau counties, and in South Dakota.

Some Metis still speak Michif, a language influenced by French, and a mixture of other European and Native American tribal languages.

Identities

Canada 

 
French Canadians living in Canada express their cultural identity using a number of terms. The Ethnic Diversity Survey of the 2006 Canadian census found that French-speaking Canadians identified their ethnicity most often as French, French Canadians, Québécois, and Acadian. The latter three were grouped together by Jantzen (2006) as "French New World" ancestries because they originate in Canada.

Jantzen (2006) distinguishes the English Canadian, meaning "someone whose family has been in Canada for multiple generations", and the French Canadien, used to refer to descendants of the original settlers of New France in the 17th and 18th centuries. "Canadien" was used to refer to the French-speaking residents of New France beginning in the last half of the 17th century. The English-speaking residents who arrived later from Great Britain were called "Anglais". This usage continued until Canadian Confederation in 1867. Confederation united several former British colonies into the Dominion of Canada, and from that time forward, the word "Canadian" has been used to describe both English-speaking and French-speaking citizens, wherever they live in the country.

Those reporting "French New World" ancestries overwhelmingly had ancestors that went back at least four generations in Canada. Fourth generation Canadiens and Québécois showed considerable attachment to their ethno-cultural group, with 70% and 61%, respectively, reporting a strong sense of belonging.

The generational profile and strength of identity of French New World ancestries contrast with those of British or Canadian ancestries, which represent the largest ethnic identities in Canada. Although deeply rooted Canadians express a deep attachment to their ethnic identity, most English-speaking Canadians of British or Canadian ancestry generally cannot trace their ancestry as far back in Canada as French speakers. As a result, their identification with their ethnicity is weaker: for example, only 50% of third generation "Canadians" strongly identify as such, bringing down the overall average. The survey report notes that 80% of Canadians whose families had been in Canada for three or more generations reported "Canadian and provincial or regional ethnic identities". These identities include French New World ancestries such as "Québécois" (37% of Quebec population) and Acadian (6% of Atlantic provinces).

Quebec

Since the 1960s, French Canadians in Quebec have generally used Québécois (masculine) or Québécoise (feminine) to express their cultural and national identity, rather than Canadien français and Canadienne française. Francophones who self-identify as Québécois and do not have French-Canadian ancestry may not identify as "French Canadian" (Canadien or Canadien français). Those who do have French or French-Canadian ancestry, but who support Quebec sovereignty, often find Canadien français to be archaic or even pejorative. This is a reflection of the strong social, cultural, and political ties that most Quebecers of French-Canadian origin, who constitute a majority of francophone Quebecers, maintain within Quebec. It has given Québécois an ambiguous meaning which has often played out in political issues, as all public institutions attached to the Government of Quebec refer to all Quebec citizens, regardless of their language or their cultural heritage, as Québécois.

Academic analysis of French Canadian culture has often focused on the degree to which the Quiet Revolution, particularly the shift in the social and cultural identity of the Québécois following the Estates General of French Canada of 1966 to 1969, did or did not create a "rupture" between the Québécois and other francophones elsewhere in Canada.

Elsewhere in Canada

The emphasis on the French language and Quebec autonomy means that French-speakers across Canada may now self-identify as québécois(e), acadien(ne), or Franco-canadien(ne), or as provincial linguistic minorities such as Franco-manitobain(e), Franco-ontarien(ne) or fransaskois(e). Education, health and social services are provided by provincial institutions, so that provincial identities are often used to identify French-language institutions:

Franco-Newfoundlanders, province of Newfoundland and Labrador, also known as Terre-Neuvien(ne)
Franco-Ontarians, province of Ontario, also referred to as Ontarien(ne)
Franco-Manitobans, province of Manitoba, also referred to as Manitobain(e)
Fransaskois, province of Saskatchewan, also referred to Saskois(e)
Franco-Albertans, province of Alberta, also referred to Albertain(e)
Franco-Columbians, province of British Columbia mostly live in the Vancouver metro area; also referred to as Franco-Colombien(ne)
Franco-Yukonnais, territory of Yukon, also referred to as Yukonais(e)
Franco-Ténois, territory of Northwest Territories, also referred to as Ténois(e)
Franco-Nunavois, territory of Nunavut, also referred to as Nunavois(e)

Acadians residing in the provinces of New Brunswick, Prince Edward Island and Nova Scotia represent a distinct ethnic French-speaking culture. This group's culture and history evolved separately from the French Canadian culture, at a time when the Maritime Provinces were not part of what was referred to as Canada, and are consequently considered a distinct culture from French Canadians.

Brayons in Madawaska County, New Brunswick and Aroostook County, Maine may be identified with either the Acadians or the Québécois, or considered a distinct group in their own right, by different sources.

French Canadians outside Quebec are more likely to self-identify as "French Canadian". Identification with provincial groupings varies from province to province, with Franco-Ontarians, for example, using their provincial label far more frequently than Franco-Columbians do. Few identify only with the provincial groupings, explicitly rejecting "French Canadian" as an identity label.

United States

During the mid-18th century, French Canadian explorers and colonists colonized other parts of North America in what are today Louisiana (called Louisianais), Mississippi, Missouri, Illinois, Wisconsin, Indiana, Ohio, far northern New York and the Upper Peninsula of Michigan as well as around Detroit. They also founded such cities as New Orleans and St. Louis and villages in the Mississippi Valley. French Canadians later emigrated in large numbers from Canada to the United States between the 1840s and the 1930s in search of economic opportunities in border communities and industrialized portions of New England. French-Canadian communities in the United States remain along the Quebec border in Maine, Vermont, and New Hampshire, as well as further south in Massachusetts, Rhode Island, and Connecticut. There is also a significant community of French Canadians in South Florida, particularly Hollywood, Florida, especially during the winter months. The wealth of Catholic churches named after St. Louis throughout New England is indicative of the French immigration to the area. They came to identify as Franco-American, especially those who were born American.

Distinctions between French Canadian, natives of France, and other New World French identities is more blurred in the U.S. than in Canada, but those who identify as French Canadian or Franco American generally do not regard themselves as French. Rather, they identify culturally, historically, and ethnically with the culture that originated in Quebec that is differentiated from French culture. In L'avenir du français aux États-Unis, Calvin Veltman and Benoît Lacroix found that since the French language has been so widely abandoned in the United States, the term "French Canadian" has taken on an ethnic rather than linguistic meaning.

French Canadian identities are influenced by historical events that inform regional cultures. For example, in New England, the relatively recent immigration (19th/20th centuries) is informed by experiences of language oppression and an identification with certain occupations, such as the mill workers. In the Great Lakes, many French Canadians also identify as Métis and trace their ancestry to the earliest voyageurs and settlers; many also have ancestry dating to the lumber era and often a mixture of the two groups.

The main Franco-American regional identities are:
 French Canadians:
 French Canadians of the Great Lakes (including Muskrat French)
 New England French
 Creoles:
 Missouri French (and other people of French ancestry in the former Illinois Country)
 Louisiana Creoles (who speak Colonial French)
 Cajuns

Culture

Agriculture 
Traditionally Canadiens had a subsistence agriculture in Eastern Canada (Québec), this subsistence agriculture slowly evolved in dairy farm during the end of the 19th century and the beginning of 20th century while retaining the subsistence side. By 1960 agriculture changed toward an industrial agriculture. French Canadians have selectively bred distinct livestock over the centuries, including cattle, horses and chickens.

Modern usage

In English usage, the terms for provincial subgroups, if used at all, are usually defined solely by province of residence, with all of the terms being strictly interchangeable with French Canadian. Although this remains the more common usage in English, it is considered outdated to many Canadians of French descent, especially in Quebec. Most francophone Canadians who use the provincial labels identify with their province of origin, even if it is not the province in which they currently reside; for example, a Québécois who moved to Manitoba would not normally change their own self-identification to Franco-Manitoban.

Increasingly, provincial labels are used to stress the linguistic and cultural, as opposed to ethnic and religious, nature of French-speaking institutions and organizations. The term "French Canadian" is still used in historical and cultural contexts, or when it is necessary to refer to Canadians of French-Canadian heritage collectively, such as in the name and mandate of national organizations which serve francophone communities across Canada. Francophone Canadians of non-French-Canadian origin such as immigrants from francophone countries are not usually designated by the term "French Canadian"; the more general term "francophones" is used for French-speaking Canadians across all ethnic origins.

Flags of French Canada

See also

 French Americans
 Quebec diaspora
 List of francophone communities in Ontario
 French language in Canada
 Canada–France relations

References

Further reading

 
 
 
 
 
 
 
 
 
 Map displaying the percentage of the US population claiming French Canadian ancestry by county, United States Census Bureau, Census 2000

 

European Canadian
French
Linguistic minorities
Ethnic minorities